Jack Donald Anderson (born January 10, 1994) is an American professional baseball pitcher for the Kane County Cougars of the American Association of Professional Baseball. Anderson is a submarine pitcher.

Career

Amateur career
Anderson attended Evanston Township High School in Evanston, Illinois. Undrafted out of high school, Anderson attended Pennsylvania State University and played four years of college baseball for the Nittany Lions. 
Anderson played for the Cotuit Kettleers of the Cape Cod League in 2015. In his senior season of 2016, he pitched to a 2.14 ERA and 13 saves in  innings. Anderson set Penn State school records for career saves (25), appearances (98), and single-season saves (13). Anderson was drafted by the Seattle Mariners in the 23rd round, with the 687th overall selection, of the 2016 MLB draft, and signed with them.

Seattle Mariners
Anderson split his professional debut season of 2016 between the AZL Mariners and the Everett AquaSox, going 3–1 with a 1.71 ERA and 18 strikeouts over 21 innings. He split the 2017 season between the Clinton LumberKings and the Modesto Nuts, going a combined 3–5 with a 2.51 ERA and 75 strikeouts over  innings. He spent the 2018 season with Modesto, going 2–4 with a 2.68 ERA and 57 strikeouts over  innings, and was the recipient of the Mariners 2018 “60 ft. 6 in. Club” award. Anderson spent the 2019 season with the Arkansas Travelers, going 4–2 with a 1.50 ERA and 51 strikeouts over 54 innings. Anderson did not play in a game in 2020 due to the cancellation of the minor league season because of the COVID-19 pandemic. Anderson would return to the Travelers for the 2021 season going 0–3 with a 5.75 ERA and 32 strikeouts over  innings. On November 12, 2021, Anderson was released by the Mariners.

Kane County Cougars
On April 4, 2022, Anderson signed with the Kane County Cougars of the American Association of Professional Baseball.

Personal life
Anderson graduated from Penn State's Smeal College of Business with a degree in supply chain and information systems.

References

External links

Penn State Nittany Lions bio

Living people
1994 births
Penn State Nittany Lions baseball players
Everett AquaSox players
Clinton LumberKings players
Modesto Nuts players
Arkansas Travelers players
Kane County Cougars players